The Chironomidae (informally known as chironomids, nonbiting midges, or lake flies) comprise a family of nematoceran flies with a global distribution. They are closely related to the Ceratopogonidae, Simuliidae, and Thaumaleidae. Many species superficially resemble mosquitoes, but they lack the wing scales and elongated mouthparts of the Culicidae.

The name Chironomidae stems from the Ancient Greek word kheironómos, "a pantomimist".

Common names and biodiversity
This is a large taxon of insects; some estimates of the species numbers suggest well over 10,000 world-wide. Males are easily recognized by their plumose antennae. Adults are known by a variety of vague and inconsistent common names, largely by confusion with other insects. For example, chironomids are known as "lake flies" in parts of Canada and Lake Winnebago, Wisconsin, but "bay flies" in the areas near the bay of Green Bay, Wisconsin. They are called "sand flies", "muckleheads", "muffleheads", "Canadian soldiers", or "American soldiers" in various regions of the Great Lakes area. They have been called "blind mosquitoes" or "chizzywinks" in Florida. However, they are not mosquitoes of any sort, and the term "sandflies" generally refers to various species of biting flies unrelated to the Chironomidae.

The group includes the wingless Belgica antarctica, the largest terrestrial animal of Antarctica.

Their larvae produce silk, and Chironomus has been studied as an alternative source of silk other than the silk moth, as it is possible to extract it without killing the animal (Ahimsa silk).

The biodiversity of the Chironomidae often goes unnoticed because they are notoriously difficult to identify and ecologists usually record them by species groups. Each morphologically distinct group comprises a number of morphologically identical (sibling) species that can only be identified by rearing adult males or by cytogenetic analysis of the polytene chromosomes. Polytene chromosomes were originally observed in the larval salivary glands of Chironomus midges by Balbiani in 1881. They form through repeated rounds of DNA replication without cell division, resulting in characteristic light and dark banding patterns which can be used to identify inversions and deletions which allow species identification.

Behavior and description
Larval stages of the Chironomidae can be found in almost any aquatic or semiaquatic habitat, including treeholes, bromeliads, rotting vegetation, soil, and in sewage and artificial containers. They form an important fraction of the macro zoobenthos of most freshwater ecosystems. They are often associated with degraded or low-biodiversity ecosystems because some species have adapted to virtually anoxic conditions and are dominant in polluted waters.
Larvae of some species are bright red in color due to a hemoglobin analog; these are often known as "bloodworms".
Their ability to capture oxygen is further increased by their making undulating movements.

Many reference sources in the past century or so have repeated the assertion that the Chironomidae do not feed as adults, but an increasing body of evidence contradicts this view. Adults of many species do, in fact, feed. The natural foods reported include fresh fly droppings, nectar, pollen, honeydew, and various sugar-rich materials.

The question whether feeding is of practical importance has by now been clearly settled for some Chironomus species, at least; specimens that had fed on sucrose flew far longer than starved specimens, and starved females longer than starved males, which suggested they had eclosed with larger reserves of energy than the males. Some authors suggest the females and males apply the resources obtained in feeding differently. Males expend the extra energy on flight, while females use their food resources to achieve longer lifespans. The respective strategies should be compatible with maximal probability of successful mating and reproduction in those species that do not mate immediately after eclosion, and in particular in species that have more than one egg mass maturing, the less developed masses being oviposited after a delay. Such variables also would be relevant to species that exploit wind for dispersal, laying eggs at intervals. Chironomids that feed on nectar or pollen may well be of importance as pollinators, but current evidence on such points is largely anecdotal. However, the content of protein and other nutrients in pollen, in comparison to nectar, might well contribute to the females' reproductive capacities.

Adults can be pests when they emerge in large numbers. They may cause difficulty during driving if they collide with the windshield, creating an opaque coating which obscures the driver's vision. They can damage paint, brick, and other surfaces with their droppings. When large numbers of adults die, they can build up into malodorous piles. They can provoke allergic reactions in sensitive individuals.

Ecology
Chironomidae had variable feeding ecology, most species feed on algae and other small soil organisms they can filtrate. Larvae and pupae are important food items for fish, such as trout, banded killifish, and sticklebacks, and for many other aquatic organisms as well such as newts. Many aquatic insects, such as various predatory hemipterans in the families Nepidae, Notonectidae, and Corixidae eat Chironomidae in their aquatic phases.  So do predatory water beetles in families such as the Dytiscidae and Hydrophilidae. The flying midges are eaten by fish and insectivorous birds, such as swallows and martins. They are also thought to be an especially important food source for tufted duck chicks during their first few days of life. They also are preyed on by bats and flying predatory insects, such as Odonata and dance flies.

The Chironomidae are important as indicator organisms, i.e., the presence, absence, or quantities of various species in a body of water can indicate whether pollutants are present. Also, their fossils are widely used by palaeolimnologists as indicators of past environmental changes, including past climatic variability. Contemporary specimens are used by forensic entomologists as medico-legal markers for the postmortem interval assessment.

A number of chironomid species inhabit marine habitats. Midges of the genus Clunio are found in the intertidal zone, where they have adjusted their entire life cycle to the rhythm of the tides. This made the species Clunio marinus an important model species for research in the field of chronobiology.

Many species are terrestrial living in soil being dominant part of soil fauna community in many wet soil habitats but also in agricultural land and early stages of succession. Chironomidae display various strategies to use various temporary habitats.

Anhydrobiosis and stress resistance

Anhydrobiosis is the ability of an organism to survive in the dry state.  Anhydrobiotic larvae of the African chironomid Polypedilum vanderplanki can withstand prolonged complete desiccation (reviewed by Cornette and Kikawada).  These larvae can also withstand other external stresses including ionizing radiation.  The effects of anhydrobiosis, gamma ray and heavy-ion irradiation on the nuclear DNA and gene expression of these larvae were studied by Gusev et al.  They found that larval DNA becomes severely fragmented both upon anhydrobiosis and irradiation, and that these breaks are later repaired during rehydration or upon recovery from irradiation.  An analysis of gene expression and antioxidant activity suggested the importance of removal of reactive oxygen species as well as the removal of DNA damages by repair enzymes.  Expression of genes encoding DNA repair enzymes increased upon entering anhydrobiosis or upon exposure to radiation, and these increases indicated that when DNA damages occurred, they were subsequently repaired.  In particular, expression of the Rad51 gene was substantially up-regulated following irradiation and during rehydration.  The Rad51 protein plays a key role in homologous recombination, a process required for the accurate repair of DNA double-strand breaks.

Subfamilies and genera
The family is divided into 11 subfamilies: Aphroteniinae, Buchonomyiinae, Chilenomyinae, Chironominae, Diamesinae, Orthocladiinae, Podonominae, Prodiamesinae, Tanypodinae, Telmatogetoninae, and Usambaromyiinae.
Most species belong to Chironominae, Orthocladiinae, and Tanypodinae.  Diamesinae, Podonominae, Prodiamesinae, and Telmatogetoninae are medium-sized subfamilies with tens to hundreds of species. The remaining four subfamilies have fewer than five species each.

Aagaardia Sæther, 2000
Abiskomyia Edwards, 1937
Ablabesmyia Johannsen, 1905
Acalcarella
Acamptocladius Brundin, 1956
Acricotopus Kieffer, 1921
Aedokritus
 Aenne
Afrochlus
Afrozavrelia Harrison, 2004
 Allocladius
 Allometriocnemus
 Allotrissocladius
Alotanypus Roback, 1971
 Amblycladius
 Amnihayesomyia
 Amphismittia
 Anaphrotenia
Anatopynia Johannsen, 1905
Ancylocladius
Andamanus
Antillocladius Sæther, 1981
Anuncotendipes
Apedilum Townes, 1945
Aphrotenia
Aphroteniella
Apometriocnemus Sæther, 1984
Apsectrotanypus Fittkau, 1962
Archaeochlus
Arctodiamesa Makarchenko, 1983
Arctopelopia Fittkau, 1962
Arctosmittia
Asachironomus
Asclerina
Asheum Sublette & Sublette, 1983
Australopelopia
Austrobrillia
Austrochlus
Austrocladius
Axarus Roback 1980
Baeoctenus
Baeotendipes Kieffer, 1913
Bavarismittia
Beardius Reiss & Sublette, 1985
Beckidia Sæther 1979
Belgica
Bernhardia
Bethbilbeckia
Biwatendipes
Boreochlus  Edwards, 1938
Boreoheptagyia Brundin 1966
Boreosmittia
Botryocladius
Brillia Kieffer, 1913
Brundiniella
Brunieria
Bryophaenocladius Thienemann, 1934
Buchonomyia Fittkau, 1955
Caladomyia
Camposimyia
Camptocladius van der Wulp, 1874
Cantopelopia
Carbochironomus Reiss & Kirschbaum 1990
Cardiocladius Kieffer, 1912
Chaetocladius Kieffer, 1911
Chasmatonotus
Chernovskiia Sæther 1977
Chilenomyia
Chirocladius
Chironomidae
Chironominae
Chironomini
Chironomus Meigen, 1803
Chrysopelopia
Cladopelma Kieffer, 1921
Cladotanytarsus Kieffer, 1921
Clinotanypus Kieffer, 1913
Clunio Haliday, 1855
Coelopynia
Coelotanypus
Coffmania
Collartomyia
Colosmittia
Compteromesa Sæther 1981
Compterosmittia
Conchapelopia Fittkau, 1957
Conochironomus
Constempellina Brundin, 1947
Corynocera Zetterstedt, 1838
Corynoneura Winnertz, 1846
Corynoneurella Brundin, 1949
Corytibacladius
Cricotopus van der Wulp, 1874
Cryptochironomus Kieffer, 1918
Cryptotendipes Lenz, 1941
Cyphomella Sæther 1977
Dactylocladius
Daitoyusurika
Demeijerea Kruseman, 1933
Demicryptochironomus Lenz, 1941
Denopelopia
Derotanypus
Diamesa  Meigen in Gistl, 1835
Diamesinae
Dicrotendipes Kieffer, 1913
Diplocladius Kieffer, 1908
Diplosmittia
Djalmabatista Fittkau, 1968
Doithrix
Doloplastus
Doncricotopus
Dratnalia
Echinocladius
Edwardsidia
Einfeldia Kieffer, 1924
Endochironomus Kieffer, 1918
Endotribelos
Epoicocladius Sulc & ZavÍel, 1924
Eretmoptera
Eukiefferiella Thienemann, 1926
Eurycnemus van der Wulp, 1874
Euryhapsis Oliver, 1981
Eusmittia
Fissimentum
Fittkauimyia
Fleuria
Freemaniella
Friederia
Georthocladius Strenzke, 1941
Gillotia Kieffer, 1921
Glushkovella
Glyptotendipes Kieffer, 1913
Goeldichironomus
Graceus Goetghebuer, 1928
Gravatamberus
Gressittius
Guassutanypus
Guttipelopia Fittkau, 1962
Gymnometriocnemus Goetghebeur, 1932
Gynnidocladius
Gynocladius Mendes, Sæther & Andrade-Morraye, 2005
Hahayusurika
Halirytus
Halocladius Hirvenoja, 1973
Hanochironomus
Hanocladius
Harnischia Kieffer, 1921
Harrisius
Harrisonina
Hayesomyia Murray & Fittkau, 1985
Heleniella Gouin, 1943
Helopelopia Roback, 1971
Henrardia
Heptagyia
Heterotanytarsus Spärck, 1923
Heterotrissocladius Spärck, 1923
Hevelius
Himatendipes
Hirosimayusurika
Hudsonimyia Roback, 1979
Hydrobaenus
Hydrosmittia
Hyporhygma
Ichthyocladius Fittkau, 1974
Ikiprimus
Ikisecundus
Imparipecten
Indoaxarus
Indocladius
Ionthosmittia
Irisobrillia
Kaluginia
Kamelopelopia
Kaniwhaniwhanus
Kiefferophyes
Kiefferulus Goetghebuer, 1922
Knepperia
Kloosia Kruseman 1933
Krenopelopia Fittkau, 1962
Krenopsectra
Krenosmittia Thienemann & Krüger, 1939
Kribiobius
Kribiocosmus
Kribiodosis
Kribiopelma
Kribiothauma
Kribioxenus
Kurobebrillia
Kuschelius
Labrundinia Fittkau, 1962
Lappodiamesa Serra-Tosio, 1968
Lappokiefferiella
Lapposmittia
Larsia Fittkau, 1962
Lasiodiamesa Kieffer, 1924
Laurotanypus
Lauterborniella Thienemann & Bause, 1913
Lepidopelopia
Lepidopodus
Lerheimia
Limaya
Limnophyes Eaton, 1875
Lindebergia
Linevitshia
Lipiniella Shilova 1961
Lipurometriocnemus
Lithotanytarsus
Litocladius Andersen, Mendes & Sæther 2004
Ljungneria
Lobodiamesa
Lobomyia
Lobosmittia
Lopescladius
Lunditendipes
Lyrocladius Mendes & Andersen, 2008
Macropelopia Thienemann, 1916
Macropelopini
Manoa
Maoridiamesa
Mapucheptagyia
Maryella
Mecaorus
Megacentron
Mesocricotopus
Mesosmittia Brundin, 1956
Metriocnemus van der Wulp, 1874
Microchironomus Kieffer, 1918
Micropsectra Kieffer, 1909
Microtendipes Kieffer, 1915
Microzetia
Molleriella
Mongolchironomus
Mongolcladius
Mongolyusurika
Monodiamesa Kieffer, 1922
Monopelopia Fittkau, 1962
Murraycladius
Nakataia
Nandeva
Nanocladius Kieffer, 1913
Naonella
Nasuticladius
Natarsia Fittkau, 1962
Neelamia
Neobrillia
Neopodonomus
Neostempellina
Neozavrelia Goetghebuer, 1941
Nesiocladius
Nilodorum
Nilodosis
Nilotanypus Kieffer, 1923
Nilothauma Kieffer, 1921
Nimbocera
Notocladius
Odontomesa Pagast, 1947
Okayamayusurika
Okinawayusurika
Olecryptotendipes Zorina, 2007
Oleia
Oliveridia Sæther, 1980
Omisus Townes, 1945
Onconeura
Ophryophorus
Oreadomyia
Orthocladiinae
Orthocladius van der Wulp, 1874
Oryctochlus
Oukuriella
Pagastia Oliver, 1959
Pagastiella Brundin, 1949
Paraboreochlus Thienemann, 1939
Parachaetocladius
Parachironomus Lenz, 1921
Paracladius Hirvenoja, 1973
Paracladopelma Harnisch, 1923
Paracricotopus Thienemann & Harnisch, 1932
Parakiefferiella Thienemann, 1936
Paralauterborniella Lenz, 1941
Paralimnophyes Brundin, 1956
Paramerina Fittkau, 1962
Parametriocnemus Goetghebuer, 1932
Pamirocesa
Paraborniella
Parachironominae
Paradoxocladius
Paraheptagyia
Paranilothauma
Parapentaneura
Paraphaenocladius Thienemann, 1924
Paraphrotenia
Parapsectra Reiss, 1969
Parapsectrocladius
Parasmittia
Paratanytarsus Thienemann & Bause, 1913
Paratendipes Kieffer, 1911
Paratrichocladius Thienemann, 1942
Paratrissocladius ZavÍel, 1937
Parochlus Enderlein, 1912
Parorthocladius Thienemann, 1935
Parvitergum
Paucispinigera
Pelomus
Pentaneura
Pentaneurella
Pentaneurini
Pentapedilum
Petalocladius
Phaenopsectra Kieffer, 1921
Physoneura
Pirara
Platysmittia Sæther, 1982
Plhudsonia
Podochlus
Podonomopsis
Podonomus
Polypedilum Kieffer, 1912
Pontomyia
Potthastia Kieffer, 1922
Prochironomus
Procladiini
Procladius Skuse, 1889
Prodiamesa Kieffer, 1906
Propsilocerus
Prosmittia
Protanypus Kieffer, 1906
Psectrocladius Kieffer, 1906
Psectrotanypus Kieffer, 1909
Pseudobrillia
Pseudochironomus Malloch, 1915
Pseudodiamesa Goetghebuer, 1939
Pseudohydrobaenus
Pseudokiefferiella Zavrel, 1941
Pseudorthocladius Goetghebuer, 1932
Pseudosmittia Goetghebuer, 1932
Psilochironomus
Psilometriocnemus Sæther, 1969
Pterosis
Qiniella
Reissmesa
Rheochlus
Rheocricotopus Brundin, 1956
Rheomus
Rheomyia
Rheopelopia Fittkau, 1962
Rheosmittia Brundin, 1956
Rheotanytarsus Thienemann & Bause, 1913
Rhinocladius
Riethia
Robackia Sæther, 1977
Saetheria Jackson, 1977
Saetheriella Halvorsen, 1982
Saetherocladius
Saetherocryptus
Saetheromyia
Saetherops
Sasayusurika
Schineriella Murray & Fittkau, 1988
Semiocladius
Setukoyusurika
Seppia
Sergentia Kieffer, 1922
Shangomyia
Shilovia
Skusella
Skutzia
Smittia Holmgren, 1869
Stackelbergina
Stelechomyia
Stempellina Thienemann & Bause, 1913
Stempellinella Brundin, 1947
Stenochironomus Kieffer, 1919
Stictochironomus Kieffer, 1919
Stictocladius
Stictotendipes
Stilocladius Rossaro, 1979
Sublettea
Sublettiella
Sumatendipes
Symbiocladius Kieffer, 1925
Sympotthastia Pagast, 1947
Syndiamesa Kieffer, 1918
Synendotendipes Grodhaus, 1987
Synorthocladius Thienemann, 1935
Tanypodinae
Tanypus Meigen, 1803
Tanytarsini
Tanytarsus van der Wulp, 1874
Tavastia
Telmatogeton Schiner, 1866
Telmatopelopia Fittkau, 1962
Telopelopia
Tempisquitoneura
Tethymyia
Thalassomya Schiner, 1856
Thalassosmittia Strenzke & Remmert, 1957
Thienemannia Kieffer, 1909
Thienemanniella Kieffer, 1911
Thienemannimyia Fittkau, 1957
Thienemanniola
Tobachironomus
Tokunagaia Sæther, 1973
Tokunagayusurika
Tokyobrillia
Tosayusurika
Townsia
Toyamayusurika
Tribelos Townes, 1945
Trichochilus

Trichosmittia
Trichotanypus Kieffer, 1906
Trissocladius Kieffer, 1908
Trissopelopia Kieffer, 1923
Trondia
Tsudayusurika
Tusimayusurika
Tvetenia Kieffer, 1922
Unniella Sæther, 1982
Usambaromyia Andersen & Sæther, 1994
Virgatanytarsus Pinder, 1982
Vivacricotopus
Wirthiella
Xenochironomus Kieffer, 1921
Xenopelopia Fittkau, 1962
Xestochironomus
Xestotendipes
Xiaomyia
Xylotopus
 Yaeprimus
 Yaequartus
 Yaequintus
 Yaesecundus
 Yaetanytarsus
 Yaetertius
Yama
Zalutschia Lipina, 1939
Zavrelia Kieffer, 1913
Zavreliella Kieffer, 1920
Zavrelimyia Fittkau, 1962
 Zelandochlus
 Zhouomyia
 Zuluchironomus

References

External links

 The Chironomid Home Page
 Chironomidae and Water Beetles of Florida
 Chironomidae Research Group, University of Minnesota
 Family Chironomidae at Soil and Water Conservation Society of Metro Halifax
 Checklist of UK Recorded Chironomidae
 Chironomidae at Nomina Insecta Nearctica 
 Chironomid Palaeoecology @ UBC Okanagan
 Chironomidae at Australian Faunal Directory
 
 Diptera.info Images

 
Nematocera families
Extant Triassic first appearances